Monochroa divisella, the scarce marsh neb, is a moth of the family Gelechiidae. It is found in Denmark, Latvia, Germany, the Netherlands, Belgium, Great Britain, the Czech Republic, Hungary, Bulgaria and France. Outside of Europe, it is known from Korea, the Russian Far East and Japan. The habitat consists of fens, marshes, river-banks and other damp areas.

The wingspan is 15–16 mm. The forewings are two-tone ochreous with two distinct black spots. Adults are on wing in June and July.

The larvae feed on Iris pseudacorus. They mine the leaves of their host plant. The mine has the form of a large, full-depth blotch mine. Pupation takes place outside of the mine.

References

Moths described in 1850
Monochroa
Moths of Japan
Moths of Europe